Rashvanlu (also Romanized as Rashvānlū) is a village in Sivkanlu Rural District, in the Central District of Shirvan County, North Khorasan Province, Iran. At the 2006 census, its population was 183, in 47 families.

References 

Populated places in Shirvan County